The uqiyyah, sometimes spelled awqiyyah, is the name for a historical unit of weight that varies between regions, as listed below. 1 uqiyyah= 40 dirham. 
1 dirham= 0.7 dinar.

It corresponds to the historical unit ounce and was defined in Iraq as one twelfth of a ratl or in parts of Egypt as one eighth of a ratl. As the ratl varied so did the uqiyyah as its part.

Egypt: 37g
Aleppo: 320g
Beirut: 213.39g
Jerusalem: 240g
Malta: ~26.46 g

The same unit, pronounced okka  in Turkish, was used in the Ottoman Empire until the early 20th century. The standard Istanbul okka equaled 128.3 g.

The ouguiya, the currency of Mauritania, takes its name from  the Hassaniya Arabic pronunciation of uqiyyah.

References 

Customary units of measurement